Pleasants Power Station is a 1.3-gigawatt (1,300 MW) coal power plant located near Belmont, West Virginia in Pleasants County, West Virginia.  The plant is owned by Energy Harbor and began operations in 1979. The power plant was the site of the Willow Island disaster in 1978.

History

In what is considered to be the deadliest construction accident in United States history, Cooling Tower #2 collapsed on April 27, 1978 as it was still under construction.  51 workers were killed in the accident.

Pleasants was completed in 1980 at a cost of $677 million. In 2008, Allegheny Energy completed a $105 million project which saw the installation of flue-gas desulfurization (FGD) technology which reduced sulfur dioxide emissions at Pleasants. FirstEnergy would assume ownership of Pleasants following its merger with Allegheny Energy in 2011.

In December 2016, FirstEnergy announced they were putting Pleasants up for sale. FirstEnergy had plans to sell Pleasants to its subsidiaries, Potomac Edison and Monongahela Power for $195 million. The sale would help meet its subsidiaries projected shortfalls of electricity demand. Although the West Virginia Public Service Commission gave a conditional approval of the sale in January 2018, it was rejected by the Federal Energy Regulatory Commission (FERC) as the sale did not meet public interest. The sale of Pleasants was cancelled the following month. This decision forced FirstEnergy to consider either selling or closing Pleasants by the end of 2018. Ownership was then transferred to FirstEnergy Solutions in September 2018 with closure delayed to June 1, 2022. To stave off a potential closure, a bill passed by the West Virginia Legislature and signed into law by Governor Jim Justice would give FirstEnergy Solutions $12.5 million in annual tax breaks.

FirstEnergy's generating division Energy Harbor (previously called FirstEnergy Solutions) announced in March 2022 that it would close both units by June 2023.

References

External links 

Willow Island, West Virginia on HistoricMonroe.org

Energy infrastructure completed in 1979
Energy infrastructure completed in 1980
FirstEnergy
Coal-fired power stations in West Virginia
Buildings and structures in Pleasants County, West Virginia